Tekkadın ruins are a group of ruins in Mersin Province, Turkey. The name of the ruins is a local name meaning "single woman". The original name is not known. The visitors follow Turkish state highway  and turn north in Atakent town.

The ancient town was a Hellenistic town . But it continued during the Roman and early Byzantine times. Presently there is small castle as well as the ruins of a  church, a number of houses, cisterns, rock tombs and sarcophagus lids.

References

Castles in Turkey
History of Mersin Province
Silifke District
Olba territorium
Ancient Greek archaeological sites in Turkey